Teemu Pulkkinen (born 2 January 1992) is a Finnish professional ice hockey left winger who is currently playing for Traktor Chelyabinsk in the Kontinental Hockey League (KHL). Pulkkinen was drafted 111th overall by the Detroit Red Wings in the 2010 NHL Entry Draft.

Playing career

Jokerit
Pulkkinen made his first appearance for Jokerit on 5 December 2008, at the age of 16. Before joining the team, he was an integral part of Jokerit's Junior-B club, scoring 36 goals and a total of 60 points in 32 games during the 2007–08 regular season. His team went on to win the Finnish championship, and Pulkkinen finished as the top scorer in the playoffs with 17 points in just six games.

During the 2010–11 season, in his rookie season with Jokerit, Pulkkinen played in 55 games, recording 18 goals and 36 assists. He broke Teemu Selänne's 20-year-old single-season record for assists by a rookie, with 36.

Professional
On 29 May 2012, Pulkkinen signed a three-year, entry-level contract with the Detroit Red Wings. During the 2012–13 season, he was assigned to the Red Wings' American Hockey League (AHL) affiliate, the Grand Rapids Griffins, in April 2013 following the completion of his third season with Jokerit in Finland. He scored his first North American goal in a Calder Cup playoff game on 1 May against the Houston Aeros. Pulkkinen played in 14 playoff games for the Griffins, recording three goals and two assists during the team's run to the Calder Cup.

During the 2013–14 season, in his first full season with the Griffins, Pulkkinen led the team in scoring, finishing with 31 goals and 28 assists in 71 games.

On 14 March 2014, Pulkkinen made his NHL debut for Detroit in a game against the Edmonton Oilers. At the time of his call-up, Pulkkinen was the Griffins' leading scorer and ranked second among all AHL rookies with 51 points in 60 games. He also led AHL rookies in goals (26), shots (175) and plus-minus rating (+20).

On 8 January 2015, Pulkkinen was recalled by the Red Wings. At the time of his call-up, Pulkkinen was the Griffins' leading scorer and ranked first in the AHL with 20 goals and second with 39 points in 33 games. He was also on an eight-game goal scoring streak for Grand Rapids, which tied the franchise record set by Donald MacLean during the 2005–06 season. It was the longest goal-scoring streak in the AHL since Drayson Bowman recorded a goal in eight-straight games early in the 2012–13 season. On 20 January, Pulkkinen scored his first career NHL goal against Devan Dubnyk of the Minnesota Wild.

On 29 January, Pulkkinen recorded his first career hat-trick, all on the power play. He became just the second player in Griffins franchise history to record three power play goals in one game, following Joe Murphy in 2001. On 15 February, Pulkkinen recorded his AHL-leading 30th goal of the season, becoming the first player in franchise history to record back-to-back 30-goal seasons. Pulkkinen finished the 2014–15 season recording 34 goals and 27 assists in 46 games for an AHL-best 1.33 points per game. He finished second in points recorded for the Griffins, and was the leading goal-scorer in the AHL, winning the Willie Marshall Award despite the fact that he played in at least 27 fewer games than the three next-highest goal scorers. Additionally, in 31 games played with the Detroit Red Wings in the NHL, Pulkkinen recorded five goals and three assists.

On 6 May 2015, Pulkkinen scored his first career Calder Cup playoff hat-trick, and the seventh playoff hat-trick in Griffins history. He also became the Griffins' all-time leading post-season goal scorer, with 17 goals, surpassing Derek King and Tomáš Tatar's tally of 16 goals. During the 2015 Calder Cup playoffs, Pulkkinen was the leading scorer for the Griffins, and led the AHL in goals, recording 14 goals and four assists in 16 games, while helping the Griffins reach the Western Conference Finals for the second time in three seasons.

On 21 July 2015, the Red Wings signed Pulkkinen to a one-year contract extension.

On 13 July 2016, the Red Wings signed Pulkkinen to another one-year contract extension, however on October 11, 2016, before the beginning of the 2016–17 season, Pulkinnen was waived by Detroit for the purpose of assignment to Grand Rapids, and was claimed off waivers by the Minnesota Wild. He appeared in 9 games with the Wild, contributing 1 goal, before he was waived and assigned to AHL affiliate, the Iowa Wild. In 47 games with Iowa, Pulkkinen lead the team with 18 goals and produced 36 points to earn a selection to the 2017 AHL All-Star Game. Unable to earn a recall to Minnesota, Pulkkinen was placed on waivers on 26 February 2017, and traded the following day to the Arizona Coyotes for future considerations. Pulkkinen played out the season with the Coyotes, scoring a lone goal in 4 games.

Having been left exposed by the Coyotes at the 2017 NHL Expansion Draft, Pulkkinen was selected by the Vegas Golden Knights on 21 June 2017. As a restricted free agent, Pulkkinen agreed to a one-year, $700,000 contract with the Golden Knights on 6 July 2017. He was assigned by Vegas to AHL affiliate, the Chicago Wolves, for the duration of the 2017–18 season. He continued his offensive dominance at the AHL level in scoring a personal high of 65 points in 75 games.

As a restricted free agent from the Golden Knights, Pulkkinen opted to pause his North American career in agreeing to a one-year contract with Belarusian club, HC Dinamo Minsk of the KHL on July 18, 2018.

On August 5, 2019, Pulkkinen was offered a PTO contract through September 8 by Lausanne HC of the National League (NL). Lausanne HC decided to end his try-out on August 29, 2019, allowing him to return to HC Dinamo Minsk of the KHL.

In the midst of his final year under contract in the 2020–21 season, Pulkkinen added 9 goals and 14 points in 22 appearances before he was traded to Lokomotiv Yaroslavl in exchange for Magnus Pääjärvi on 30 November 2020.

At the conclusion of his contract with Lokomotiv, Pulkkinen signed on the opening day of free agency, agreeing to a two-year contract with Traktor Chelyabinsk on 1 May 2021. Following the 2022 Russian invasion of Ukraine, he decided to participate in the 2021-22 KHL postseason, despite the exit of the majority of Finnish players and two of the KHL's non-Russia-based teams.

International play

Pulkkinen represented Finland at the 2009 IIHF World U18 Championships in the United States, where he recorded 13 points in six games to finish third in tournament scoring, behind teammate Toni Rajala and Russian Vladimir Tarasenko, helping lead Finland to a bronze medal. With 28 points, Pulkkinen currently ranks second all-time in IIHF World U18 Championship scoring.

In the 2010 IIHF World U18 Championships, Pulkkinen recorded ten goals and five assists in six games to become the tournament's leading scorer; he was also selected as the tournament's best forward.

Pulkkinen was part of the Finnish national team for the 2012 World Junior Championships. In a game against Denmark on 30 December 2011, Pulkkinen scored four goals in the third period, part of a five-point game for him; this tied a record for most goals in a period during a World Junior game, first set by Ján Vodila of Czechoslovakia during the 1980 World Juniors.

Pulkkinen represented Finland at the 2016 IIHF World Championship, where he recorded two assists in eight games and won a silver medal.

Career statistics

Regular season and playoffs

International

Awards and honours

References

External links
 
Pulkkinen's profile on Jokerit.com 
Pulkkinen's profile on SM-liiga.com 

1992 births
Living people
Arizona Coyotes players
Chicago Wolves players
Detroit Red Wings draft picks
Detroit Red Wings players
HC Dinamo Minsk players
HC Dynamo Moscow players
Finnish expatriate ice hockey players in the United States
Finnish ice hockey left wingers
Grand Rapids Griffins players
Iowa Wild players
Jokerit players
Lokomotiv Yaroslavl players
Minnesota Wild players
Sportspeople from Vantaa
Traktor Chelyabinsk players
Finnish expatriate ice hockey players in Belarus
Finnish expatriate ice hockey players in Russia